William E. Breese Sr. House is a historic house located at 674 Biltmore Avenue in Asheville, Buncombe County, North Carolina.

Description and history 
It was built in 1891 by architect Charles B. Leonard, and is a -story, rectangular timber-framed dwelling in the Queen Anne style. It features an off-center entrance tower with a steeply pitched pyramidal roof. The building housed a sanatorium, called Sherwood Sanatorium, from around 1927 to 1932. After 1939, the building housed a tourist home known as Cedar Crest.

It was listed on the National Register of Historic Places on April 28, 1980.

References

External links

Houses on the National Register of Historic Places in North Carolina
Queen Anne architecture in North Carolina
Houses completed in 1891
Houses in Asheville, North Carolina
National Register of Historic Places in Buncombe County, North Carolina